Broken Circle/Spiral Hill is an earthwork sculpture by the American artist Robert Smithson. It was created for the 1971 Sonsbeek outdoor sculpture exhibition. The piece is located in Emmen, Netherlands.

Description
Broken Circle/Spiral Hill is the sole large-scale earthwork piece created by Smithson outside of the United States. It was commissioned as a temporary public work of art. In 1971, when it was commissioned, “No (written) agreements were made concerning the ownership and future maintenance of the work.”

The approximately  diameter Broken Circle earthwork consists of a jetty and canal; it was constructed of white and yellow sand on the bank of a quarry lake 10-to-15 (3 - 4.5 m) feet deep.

The New York Times states that Smithson conceived of the two forms as the "section in the water is a centrifugal image; the path of its earthbound companion is centripetal." Gary Shapiro, in his book, Earthwards: Robert Smithson and Art after Babel, writes that the two elements had a "decentering" effect. The complexity of the site also informed the sculptural elements, referencing both the industrial use of the site, as well as the topography of Holland's "artificial land". Smithson also mentioned that he was inspired by the 1953 flooding disaster in the Netherlands, and the vicinity of stone-age dolmen (hunebedden) near the artwork.

Smithson wrote of the glacial erratic boulder in the center of Broken Circle as an "accidental center":

Smithson conceived of the Spiral Hill as a kind of viewing platform for Broken Circle and for the surrounding "broken landscapes" consisting of pasture lands and mining operations.

Broken Circle/Spiral Hill was Smithson's first land reclamation project, where an industrial site was "reclaimed" as a work of art.

Site and realisation

Sonsbeek 

Smithson was asked to realise a work in the Netherlands for the 1971 Sonsbeek exhibition. This art festival was held at an irregular schedule in and around the Sonsbeek park in Arnhem. For the 1971 edition Wim Beeren, curator at the Stedelijk Museum in Amsterdam, was asked to be the exhibition curator. He decided to build the exhibition to center around the theme Buiten de perken ("Out of bounds"), and locate many of the pieces around the Netherlands instead of only focusing on the Sonsbeek park in Arnhem.

Location 
Looking for a proper location for the work, Smithson got in contact with Sjouke Zijlstra, a social geographer and head of centre for the arts in Emmen. He suggested a sand quarry in Emmerschans, a neighbourhood northeast of the Emmen city center, noting its mineral-laden green water.  This quarry was owned by the local De Boer family, run under the name Zand- en Exploitatiemaatschappij Emmen B.V. ("Sand and Exploitation Company Emmen Inc."). The company is currently owned by Gerard de Boer, who was six years old when the Smithson project was realised. The De Boer family worked together with Smithson to realise the project.

Preparatory drawings
During 1970 and 71, Smithson made a series of preparatory concept and working drawing for Emmen that brought to light his interest in entropy. The preparatory drawing Broken Circle, Emmen, Holland, 1971 notes that the "view point" is Spiral Hill, as well as a notation to move the boulder outside of the circle. The art historian, Eugenie Tsai has written that Smithson's drawings for Broken Circle/Spiral Hill and Spiral Jetty informed his plans for "ground systems" earthworks for the Dallas-Fort Worth airport, a project that was never realized.

The preparatory drawing Spiral Hill, Emmen, Holland 1971, notes that Smithson originally wanted to build the hill out of peat blocks.

According to the book, Robert Smithson: Retrospective, one of Smithson's first concepts for the Emmen sand quarry was an unrealized earthwork Meandering Canal, Emmen, Holland 1971. The pencil drawing shows a winding canal with four meandering "oxbows" and four hill mounds. He also created a drawing from this time, Peat Bog Sprawl, Emmen Holland, 1971, depicting over 30 huge blocks of peat, 8 ft. by 3 ft. by 4 ft. each.

Maintenance and future 
After the construction of the site there was talk of the piece becoming permanent instead of just temporary for the Sonsbeek exhibition. Smithson left correspondence indicating that artwork was "a gift to the Netherlands or the Dutch people", but details on maintenance and who should be responsible for the maintenance of the work were lacking. The De Boer family, who owned the site and realised the work together with Smithson, did allow for visits and excursions of the otherwise private site, which was still an active sand quarry as well.

In 1972 the work already showed signs of disrepair, due to erosion. The municipality of Emmen planted vegetation to keep the work from deteriorating.

On the 40th anniversary of the work a short documentary on the realisation of the work was released. The documentary contains footage shot by Nancy Holt, Smithson's widow, during the 1971 construction of the piece. Aerial shots were included in the documentary.

In 2019 the site was sold from the De Boer family to a new owner. The last time the site was open to the public was in 2021, celebrating the 50th anniversary of the work.

Gallery

See also
 Spiral Jetty

References

Further reading
 Robert Smithson: Land Reclamation and the Sublime, Thomas Dreher
 Broken Circle and Spiral Hill: having entropy the Dutch way, Anja Novak
 Robert Smithson's monumental earthwork 'Broken Circle/Spiral Hill' opens in the netherlands

External links

 Holt Smithson Foundation
 Broken Circle official website

Land art
Sculpture
Public art in the Netherlands
Environmental art
Land reclamation